Opsotheresia is a genus of bristle flies in the family Tachinidae. There are at least two described species in Opsotheresia.

Species
Opsotheresia bigelowi (Curran, 1926)
Opsotheresia obesa Townsend, 1919

References

Dexiinae
Diptera of North America
Tachinidae genera
Taxa named by Charles Henry Tyler Townsend